was a Japanese daimyō of the late Edo period, who ruled the Satsuma Domain as its 12th and last daimyō until 1871. He succeeded his father, Hisamitsu, as the head of the Shimazu family in 1887. In 1897, he fell ill and died, and was succeeded as the head of the family by his son, Shimazu Tadashige.

Children
 Shimazu Tadashige (1886–1968)

Ancestry

References

 Mainichi Shimbun. 日本の肖像―旧皇族・華族秘蔵アルバム〈第8巻〉 

|-

1840 births
1897 deaths
Shimazu clan
Tozama daimyo
People of the Boshin War
Meiji Restoration
Kazoku